Anna Godoy Contreras (born 21 October 1992) is a Spanish triathlete. She competed in the women's event at the 2020 Summer Olympics held in Tokyo, Japan. She also competed in the mixed relay event.

In 2010, she competed in the girls' triathlon and mixed relay events at the 2010 Summer Youth Olympics held in Singapore.

References

External links
 

1992 births
Living people
Spanish female triathletes
Triathletes at the 2010 Summer Youth Olympics
Competitors at the 2018 Mediterranean Games
Mediterranean Games silver medalists for Spain
Mediterranean Games medalists in triathlon
Olympic triathletes of Spain
Triathletes at the 2020 Summer Olympics
Sportspeople from Barcelona
21st-century Spanish women